LitSat-1 was one of the first two Lithuanian satellites (other one being Lituanica SAT-1). It was launched aboard the second Cygnus spacecraft along with 28 Flock-1 CubeSats aboard an Antares 120 carrier rocket flying from Pad 0B at the Mid-Atlantic Regional Spaceport on Wallops Island. The launch was scheduled to occur in December 2013, but later was rescheduled to 9 January 2014 and occurred then. The satellite was deployed from the International Space Station via the NanoRacks Cubesat Deployer on February 28, 2014. Three Lithuanian words will be broadcast from space "Lietuva myli laisvę" (Lithuania loves freedom). Launch of satellites Lituanica SAT-1 and LitSat-1 was broadcast live in Lithuania.

On 6 March 2014 the satellite radio station of Kaunas University of Technology (KTU) established a two-way connection with LitSat-1 for the first time.

References

External links 
 Official website

2014 in Lithuania
Spacecraft launched in 2014
Satellites orbiting Earth
First artificial satellites of a country
Satellites of Lithuania
Student satellites
Satellites deployed from the International Space Station